Luigi Riccardi (Lione, 1808Milan, 1877) was an Italian painter. He created landscapes and watercolors. He trained under Giuseppe Bisi, and was influenced by Massimo d'Azeglio He painted marine vistas and landscapes. In 1865, he began teaching at the Brera; his work is mostly found in Milan, including at the Galleria d'Arte Moderna and Poldi-Pezzoli Museum. Eugenio Gignous was one of his pupils.

References
Enciclopedia La Piccola Treccani rsondata

19th-century Italian painters
Italian male painters
1808 births
1877 deaths
Painters from Milan
Academic staff of Brera Academy
19th-century Italian male artists